Steve Taylor (born January 7, 1967) is an American former professional football player who was a quarterback in the Canadian Football League (CFL).  Taylor had signed a four-year contract with the Edmonton Eskimos just one month after finishing his senior season at the University of Nebraska. The dual-threat QB was selected in the twelfth round of the 1989 NFL Draft by the Indianapolis Colts in April, but Taylor was already committed to playing in the CFL.

Starting in the summer of 1989, Taylor played for four CFL teams: the Eskimos, Calgary Stampeders, Hamilton Tiger-Cats, and Ottawa Rough Riders.  He spent his entire career of eight seasons as a backup, playing behind notable CFL starters such as Tracy Ham and Doug Flutie.  Taylor's career passing statistics included 4,947 yards passing with 35 touchdowns and 26 interceptions.   He completed 366-of-652 pass attempts during his CFL career.

Collegiate career
Taylor's college football career at Nebraska was quite different. The ,  option quarterback was the perfect fit for head coach Tom Osborne's vaunted option offense.

As a true freshman in 1985,  Taylor came off the bench to help Nebraska come back and nearly defeat Michigan in the Fiesta Bowl—a game the Wolverines  As a sophomore in 1986, he was the player of the game in the Sugar Bowl and the Huskers finished  ranked fifth in the 

Taylor passed for 2,815 yards and rushed for 2,125 yards in a tailback predicated option offense that featured such excellent Husker running backs as Keith "End Zone" Jones, Doug DuBose, Tom Rathman, and Ken Clark. He recorded 32 rushing touchdowns and 30 touchdown passes. His best single season came as a senior in 1988 when he rushed 157 times for 826 yards and completed 72-of-151 passing attempts for 1,067 yards with 11 touchdowns and seven interceptions.

One of Taylor's most memorable games was in 1987 on September 12, in  win over third-ranked UCLA, led by talented quarterback  Taylor threw for a school record five touchdown passes including a 48-yard scoring toss to wide receiver Rod Smith and two approximate 35-yard touchdown passes to tight end Todd Millikan.  Taylor was 10-of-15 passing for 217 yards without an interception and had 12 rushes for 27 yards. He was named a third-team All-American by the Associated Press that season.

Another such moment came in 1988 when Nebraska met Oklahoma State, with famous running back Barry Sanders, on October 15 in Lincoln; Nebraska outscored the tenth-ranked Cowboys  a team that went  that season.  Taylor overcame Sanders' 189-yard rushing performance with a solid performance of his own that included the Husker signal caller rushing for 140 yards on eleven carries while completing 6-of-11 passes for 92 yards.  Taylor threw an 11-yard touchdown pass and scored on rushes of 60, 43, and nine yards in a game that included over 1,000 yards of combined

Statistics

Personal life

Taylor is now a real estate sales associate with Lincoln First Realty in Lincoln, Nebraska where he, his wife, and their three daughters currently reside.

References

Additional sources
 Huskerpedia

1967 births
Living people
Sportspeople from Fresno, California
Players of American football from California
American football quarterbacks
Nebraska Cornhuskers football players
Indianapolis Colts players
American players of Canadian football
Canadian football quarterbacks
Edmonton Elks players
Calgary Stampeders players
Hamilton Tiger-Cats players
Ottawa Rough Riders players